Mahabubabad (Ancient Name - Manukota) is a town and the district headquarters of Mahabubabad district in the Indian state of Telangana. It is on the west bank of the Munneru, which is one of the tributaries of the River Krishna. Mahabubabad is known for the Bayyaram Mines.

Weather 

Mahbubabad has a semi-tropical climate, where the people and its surroundings are pleasant and enjoyable. During summers, the temperatures soar to more than 48 °C. In winters, temperatures range between 12 °C and 27 °C, which is pleasant. Mahbubabad receives the North-East and the South-West monsoon, from June to September, and from October to November respectively. Mainly relies on the monsoons and rainfall. Details of the weather are available at

Demographics 
The population of Mahabubabad is around 42,851 according to 2011 census reports. The male population is 20,716 (48.3%) and the female is 22,135 (51.6%). The female-to-male ratio is 1068:1000, which is above the national average 943:1000. The literacy rate is 79.17%, more than national average 74%.
Male literacy is 86.59%, which is more than national average of 82.10%, and female literacy rate is 72.32%, more than national average 65.50%. Once it was the biggest revenue division in Telangana state, even bigger than Hanamkonda village. Later it was divided into two divisions.

The majority of the villages and the hamlets including the city are the habitats of Scheduled Tribes (75%). The tribal community is Lambadi. Thus the majority of people of the city will communicate in the special tribal language, Lambadi or Banjara (60%). This language is one among the officially recognised dialects by the government of India. This language has no script and is sustained on spoken words.

Government and politics 
Mahabubabad Municipality was constituted in 2011 and is classified as a second grade municipality.

Politics 
Mahabubabad has one seat for state Assembly constituency. Banoth Shankar Naik Telangana Rashtra Samithi (TRS) was elected as Member of Legislative Assembly in the 2014 general elections. It is a grade 2 municipality. The R.D.O. and M.R.O. look after the revenue administration.  Earlier Hanamkonda and Warangal were two Lok Sabha Constituencies in the same area, but recently the Election Commission of India based on the population census has shifted Warangal Lok Sabha Constituency to Mahabubabad.

Nearest cities
 Khammam-50 km
 Warangal-73 km
 Suryapet-83 km
 Hyderabad-212 km

Transport 
Mahabubabad is well connected with road and rail routes to every other place of the state and the nation.

Roadways 

Mahabubabad has a bus depot of TSRTC with 100-bus capacity. It has many services for the needs of the citizens. It falls on the main route of Warangal-Bhadrachalam. Nearly 20,000 people go from here daily through the bus facilities. In addition, apart from the main bus stand, to meet the needs of the passengers there are Kuravi bus stand, Thorruur bus stand, Pusalapalli bus stop, and many seven-seat autorickshaws and Commander Jeeps connecting the nearby villages.

Railways 
Mahabubabad has one of the busiest railway stations in the Kazipet-Vijayawada route. Nearly as many as 4000 passengers travel through this system daily. People here will prefer rail route than to bus route to reach distant destinations. The Mahabubabad railway station had been graded as 'B1-Category Railway Station' by the South Central Railway from 2004.

Media 
Mahabubabad has print and entertainment media. There is also Citi Cable, a local entertainment channel for broadcasting TV and for internet there is also ISP providers like Anusha broadband,hireach broadband services.

Print media 
Sirachukka is the local tabloid circulated weekly. The leading Telugu newspapers have their regional centres here for updating the news.

References

External links

Mahabubabad district
Cities and towns in Mahabubabad district